Colleen Rae Lawless, née Schuster, (born 1983) is an American lawyer serving as a United States district judge of the United States District Court for the Central District of Illinois. She was associate judge of the Seventh Judicial Circuit in Sangamon County, Illinois from 2019 to 2023.

Education 
Lawless earned a Bachelor of Arts degree from Illinois Wesleyan University in 2005 and a Juris Doctor from the Northern Illinois University College of Law in 2009.

Career 
From 2009 to 2019, Lawless was a lawyer and shareholder at Londrigan, Potter & Randle P.C. in Springfield, Illinois. From 2019 to 2023, she served as an associate judge of the Illinois Circuit Court for the 7th district.

Notable case as lawyer 

 In 2011, Lawless represented Marvin Manns, an African American water maintenance worker who sued the city of Decatur for discrimination after he was terminated. Manns refused to sign an agreement that gave him a lower pay but allowed him to bypass civil service selection rules.

Federal judicial service 

On September 2, 2022, President Joe Biden announced his intent to nominate Lawless to serve as a United States district judge of the United States District Court for the Central District of Illinois. On September 6, 2022, her nomination was sent to the Senate. President Biden nominated Lawless to the seat to be vacated by Judge Sue E. Myerscough, who will assume senior status upon confirmation of a successor. On November 15, 2022, a hearing on her nomination was held before the Senate Judiciary Committee. On December 8, 2022, her nomination was reported out of committee by a 15–7 vote. On January 3, 2023, her nomination was returned to the President under Rule XXXI, Paragraph 6 of the United States Senate. She was renominated on January 23, 2023. On February 9, 2023, her nomination was reported out of committee by a 14–7 vote. On March 1, 2023, the Senate invoked cloture on her nomination by a 53–43 vote. On March 2, 2023, her nomination was confirmed by a 51–41 vote. She received her judicial commission on March 9, 2023.

References

External links 

1983 births
Living people
21st-century American women judges
21st-century American judges
21st-century American women lawyers
21st-century American lawyers
Illinois lawyers
Illinois state court judges
Illinois Wesleyan University alumni
Judges of the United States District Court for the Central District of Illinois
Northern Illinois University alumni
People from Joliet, Illinois
United States district court judges appointed by Joe Biden